Pointe-à-Raquette is a commune in the La Gonâve Arrondissement, in the Ouest department of Haiti. It has 22,886 inhabitants.

References

Populated places in Ouest (department)
Communes of Haiti